Fisher Library may refer to the following libraries:

The main library of the University of Sydney Library system
Thomas Fisher Rare Book Library, a library of the University of Toronto library system
Fisher Fine Arts Library at the University of Pennsylvania, Philadelphia, PA